Nguyễn Văn Bình (born 4 March 1961 in Phú Thọ Province) was governor of the State Bank of Vietnam from 2011 to 2016. He is member of the CPV Central Committee, tenure 11. He was appointed as Governor of the State Bank of Việt Nam at the first session of the 13th National Assembly. He was replaced as Governor of the State Bank, with Lê Minh Hưng taking his place on 9 April 2016.

References

1961 births
Living people
Governors of the State Bank of Vietnam
Members of the 12th Politburo of the Communist Party of Vietnam
Members of the 12th Secretariat of the Communist Party of Vietnam
Members of the 11th Central Committee of the Communist Party of Vietnam
Members of the 12th Central Committee of the Communist Party of Vietnam
People from Phú Thọ province